The 1988–89 BBL season was the second season of the British Basketball League (known as the Carlsberg League for sponsorship reasons) since its establishment in 1987. The season featured a total of 11 teams, playing 20 games each. The league had suffered in the 1989 close season because Portsmouth was wound up followed by Calderdale Explorers and Birmingham Bullets both dropping out of the league. Bolton and Bury Giants became the Olympic City Giants and Kingston moved north of the border playing as Glasgow Rangers. The new season was supposed to feature 12 teams, however Oldham Celtics dropped out of the league and into the National League (Tier 2) after just one game, due to financial difficulties.

The season was dominated by the success of the league's two Scottish teams Glasgow Rangers and Livingston, who finished the regular season in first and second place respectively. Glasgow's Kevin Cadle and Alan Cunningham were also named as the league's Coach and Player of the year, however the Scottish dominance was broken by Bracknell Tigers who were victorious in the League Trophy against Livingston in the Final.

Below the Carlsberg League in the National League Division 1, it came as no surprise that Oldham Celtics sealed the title bearing in mind that they had originally planned to play in the top tier.

Carlsberg League (Tier 1)

Final standings

Play-offs

Quarter-finals 
(1) Glasgow Rangers vs. (8) Olympic City Giants

(2) Livingston vs. (7) Hemel Royals

(3) Sunderland 76ers vs. (6) Bracknell Tigers

(4) Leicester City Riders vs. (5) Manchester Eagles

Semi-finals

Third place

Final

National League Division 1 (Tier 2)

Final standings

Coca-Cola National Cup

Second Round

Quarter-finals

+ Derby expelled after match was abandoned following a scuffle

Semi-finals

Final

NatWest Trophy

Group stage 
North Group
South Group

Despite dropping out of the Carlsberg League and into the National League after just one game of the season, Oldham Celtics continued their schedule in the League Trophy.

Quarter-finals 
Glasgow Rangers vs. Olympic City Giants

Livingston vs. Manchester Eagles

Bracknell Tigers vs. Derby Rams

Leicester City Riders vs. Solent Stars

Semi-finals 
Glasgow Rangers vs. Livingston

Bracknell Tigers vs. Leicester City Riders

Final

Seasonal awards 
 Most Valuable Player: Alan Cunningham (Glasgow Rangers)
 Coach of the Year: Kevin Cadle (Glasgow Rangers)
 All-Star Team:
 Tony Balogun (Leicester City Riders)
 Jimmy Brandon (Leicester City Riders)
 Tommy Collier (Livingston)
 Alan Cunningham (Glasgow Rangers)
 Dan Davis (Glasgow Rangers)
 Lorenzo Duncan (Hemel Royals)
 Butch Hays (Glasgow Rangers)
 Russ Saunders (Sunderland 76ers)
 Phil Smith (Solent Stars)
 Clyde Vaughan (Sunderland 76ers)

References 

British Basketball League seasons
1
British